Santa's Village is a Christmas-themed amusement park located in Jefferson, New Hampshire.

Most of the 23 rides have Christmas or winter-themed names, such as "Rudy's Rapid Transit Coaster" and "The Great Humbug Adventure".  The rides are designed for families with children under age 13.  There are also three theatres, two of which present live shows and a third that features a 3-D film called A Tinkerdoodle Christmas. Visitors can visit Santa's home, sit in his rocking chair, and have a picture taken with Santa.

History and attractions

Santa's Village was the brainchild of Normand and Cecile Dubois who, in the early 1950s, wanted to create something novel to their region. Seeing deer crossing the road sparked Norman's belief that the North Country in New Hampshire would serve well as Santa and his reindeers' home. On Father's Day, in 1953, the family amusement park was opened for the first time to the general public. In its first year, the park had pony rides and showcased Francis the Famous Mule in a mule performance. The amusement park staff frequently gave her oats from a whiskey bottle to wheedle her to move. The Duboises also invited Santa Claus to the park; he was accompanied by real reindeer and numerous elves. The park was later enlarged to include a "Santa Schoolhouse", a "Blacksmith Shop", "Santa's Workshop" and a chapel. In 1955, the park was open from June to October.

By 1969, the park also had playgrounds, restaurants, and a "Jingle Jamboree". The Dubois family added a dancing chicken and rabbit performance to the park's activities. By 1974, the Dubois' son-in-law, Michael Gaynor, took over the park's management after the couple retired. The admission for people over four years old in 1974 was $3. Peggy Newland of The Nashua Telegraph wrote in 2010 that "[b]y the 1980s, the park had grown to a 'real' amusement park". The park was further expanded, with a "Yule Log Flume" that glided down a Christmas-themed river, carrying people around the park. Macaws performed in the park, roller-skating around the stage and balancing bikes on a tightrope.

In 1986, Jack Barth of Spy wrote that Santa's Village has a "strange arrangement", in that to take pictures, people poke their heads out of a cake made of plaster. The grandchildren of Normand and Cecile Dubois manage the park. They added a "Polar Theater" with 3D shows that include elves that dance and a tree that sings, as well as "Skyways Sleighs", which transport people through the sky to different parts of the park.

Near the park's duck pond is a life-size Nativity scene. The park also has a wishing well, where children can make a wish and toss coins in. The money from the wishing well is given to marginalized children through the form of Christmas gifts. In the first year of the village, more than $1000 from the well was used to buy gifts for marginalized children.

Mick Foley wrote in his autobiography The Hardcore Diaries that he has a Christmas fixation and that "every good thing in my life somehow leads me back to Jefferson, New Hampshire, and the trip to Santa's Village my parents took me on when I was only three years old". In his list of top ten amusement parks, Foley placed Santa's Village first, writing that "[w]hat it lacks in rides, it makes up for in personal nostalgia, a beautiful location, and the magic of Christmas in the summer".

Attractions

References

External links
 

Buildings and structures in Coös County, New Hampshire
Amusement parks in New Hampshire
Santa Claus
Tourist attractions in Coös County, New Hampshire
1953 establishments in New Hampshire
Jefferson, New Hampshire
Amusement parks opened in 1953